Nucleoporin GLE1 is a protein that in humans is encoded by the GLE1 gene on chromosome 9.

Function 

This gene encodes a predicted 75-kDa polypeptide with high sequence and structure homology to yeast Gle1p, which is nuclear protein with a leucine-rich nuclear export sequence essential for poly(A)+RNA export. Inhibition of human GLE1L by microinjection of antibodies against GLE1L in HeLa cells resulted in inhibition of poly(A)+RNA export. Immunoflourescence studies show that GLE1L is localized at the nuclear pore complexes. This localization suggests that GLE1L may act at a terminal step in the export of mature RNA messages to the cytoplasm. Two alternatively spliced transcript variants encoding different isoforms have been found for this gene.

Clinical significance 

A genome-wide screening and linkage analysis assigned the disease locus of lethal congenital contracture syndrome, one of 40 Finnish heritage diseases, to a defined region of 9q34, where the GLE1 gene is located. Mutations in GLEI have been identified in families with foetal motoneuron disease.

Interactions 

GLE1L has been shown to interact with NUP155.

References

Further reading